Charlotte Hill O'Neal (born March 9, 1951) is co-director of the United African American Community Center, now called the United African Alliance Community Center (UAACC). The UAACC, a non-profit NGO, was founded in 1991 by O'Neal and her husband, Pete O’Neal, with the goal of empowering black urban and rural youth in Tanzania. She and Pete have two children together, Malcolm and AnnWood "Stormy" O'Neal.

Early life and education 
O'Neal is from Kansas City, Kansas, where she became a member of the Kansas City chapter of the Black Panther Party in 1969. She would marry the head of the chapter Pete O'Neal.

Activism 
At the age of 17, O'Neal became a member of the Kansas School of Human Dignity where she went around to churches and schools in the local community to speak about Black history.

Other work 
O'Neal is a published author with two books of poetry. Her first poetry book titled Warrior Woman of Peace was published in 2008 and features poems on her personal experiences as a woman and on the women who have impacted her life. Life Slices...a Taste of Magic was published in 2016.

References

External links 
 Charlotte Hill O'Neal (Organizer)'s webpage

1951 births
American activists
Created via preloaddraft
Living people
Members of the Black Panther Party
20th-century American women
21st-century American women